"Heaven" is a song recorded by American country music singer Kane Brown for the re-release of his self-titled debut album on October 6, 2017. It was released as the third single from the album on November 13, 2017.

Background
The song was written by Shy Carter, Matt McGinn, and Lindsay Rimes. Billboard described it as a "romantic slow jam." Kane Brown first discovered the song at a writer's retreat where he heard it from through the floor while he was working on another song ("What's Mine Is Yours") upstairs. He decided to cut it because it instantly reminded him of his fiancée.

Composition
The song is in the key of A major with a moderately slow tempo of approximately 80 beats per minute. It follows the chord progression D-A-Fm-E. Brown's vocals range from F-F.

Chart performance
"Heaven" reached number one on the US Country Airplay chart dated May 19, 2018, becoming Brown's second number one on the chart.  It also reached number two on the US Hot Country Songs chart. As of April 2019, the single sold 722,000 copies in the US. On September 29, 2020, the single was certified septuple platinum by the Recording Industry Association of America (RIAA) for combined sales and streaming equivalent units of over seven million units in the United States.

Music video
The music video for "Heaven" was directed by Alex Alvga and released on October 6, 2017. In it, Brown performs the song in a white T-shirt and jeans alone at a microphone stand in a room lit with an assortment of candles.

Charts

Weekly charts

Year-end charts

Decade-end charts

Certifications

References

2017 songs
2017 singles
Kane Brown songs
RCA Records Nashville singles
Song recordings produced by Dann Huff
Songs written by Shy Carter
Songs written by Matt McGinn (songwriter)
Country ballads
Songs written by Lindsay Rimes
Billboard Country Airplay number-one singles of the year